Namutumba is a town in the Namutumba District of the Eastern Region of Uganda. It is the main municipal, administrative, and commercial centre of the district.

Location
To the northeast of Namutumba is Tirinyi in Kibuku District, another small town on the main Iganga–Tirinyi–Kamonkoli–Mbale Road. The coordinates of Namutumba are 0°50'06.0"N, 33°41'06.0"E (Latitude:0.8350; Longitude:33.6850).

Population
In 2014, the national population census and household survey put the population of Namutumba Town, at 18,736. In 2020, the Uganda Bureau of Statistics (UBOS) estimated the mid-year population of the town at 22,600. The population agency calculated the average annual growth rate of Namutumba's population at 3.31 percent, between 2014 and 2020.

Points of interest
The following additional points of interest lie within the town limits or close to the edges of the town:

1. The offices of Namutumba Town Council

2. The offices of Namutumba District Administration Headquarters

3. Namutumba Central Market

4. Namutumba Community Hospital

5. The Iganga–Mbale Road also Tirinyi Road: the road passes through the middle of town, in a general southwest to northeast direction.

6. Namutumba Islamic Hospital, a 60-bed hospital under development since 2016.

International relations
Namutumba is twinned with the town of Ross-on-Wye, England.

See also
Busoga sub-region
Lusoga language
Basoga
List of cities and towns in Uganda

References

External links
Half of Namutumba Children Malnourished

Namutumba District
Populated places in Eastern Region, Uganda
Cities in the Great Rift Valley
Busoga